Theofanis "Fanis" Toutziaris (born 8 January 1965) is a former Greek international footballer that played as a striker for Makedonikos, Iraklis and Aris and Apollon Kalamarias.

Club career
Toutziaris signed for Iraklis in January 1987 From Makedonikos. In the 1993–94 season he was Iraklis' topscorer with 20 goals out of 33 appearances. In a timespan of 8 years he played 238 league games for Iraklis and scored 62 goals. In January 1995 he left Iraklis for Aris. He stayed with Aris for two years appearing in no less than 40 occasions and scoring 11 goals. He finished his career with Apollon Kalamarias in the second half of the 1996–97 season appearing in 9 matches and scoring 3 goals.

International career
Toutziaris made his debut for Greece in a friendly loss against Turkey on 29 March 1989. Totally he earned 4 caps for Greece and scored once.

References

1965 births
Living people
Greece international footballers
Greek footballers
Super League Greece players
Iraklis Thessaloniki F.C. players
Aris Thessaloniki F.C. players
Apollon Pontou FC players
Association football forwards
Footballers from Thessaloniki